Road to Paris is a 2001 documentary film showing the preparation of Lance Armstrong, then twice winner of Tour de France, and his team, US Postal Service Pro Cycling Team, for the 2001 Tour de France. The film was shot during April, covering races such as Circuit de la Sarthe, Gent–Wevelgem, Paris–Roubaix and Amstel Gold Race, mainly featuring Lance Armstrong and George Hincapie. The film was produced by Nike, Inc.

References

External links
Official site
 

2001 films
Documentary films about cycling
Lance Armstrong
2001 Tour de France
Tour de France mass media
2000s English-language films